Kevin Jake Dionson Cataraja (born May 6, 1995) is a Filipino professional boxer. He is the current OPBF Super Flyweight champion.

Education
Cataraja attended University of Cebu for his collegiate studies obtaining a degree in criminology in 2017.

Boxing career

Flyweight division
On 11 July 2015, Cataraja made his professional debut in boxing. Cataraja defeated Indonesian boxer Ardi Tefa via a Round 6 knockout (KO). 4 months after his debut, Cataraja defeated Indonesian boxer Ellias Nggenggo via a Round 4 technical knockout (TKO). 3 months later, Cataraja registered another victory by defeating Mexican boxer Pedro Antonio Rodriguez, winning a unanimous decision (UD) through eight rounds.

On 28 May 2016, Cataraja extended his winning streak in just 3 months after his win against Rodriguez by defeating Thai boxer Wanchai Nianghansa via a Round 4 technical knockout (TKO).

Super Flyweight division
Following the bout, Cataraja moved up one division, to super flyweight, defeated fellow Filipino boxer John Kenan Villaflor six months after his latest bout, winning a technical knockout (TKO) in the first round. Cataraja's next bout was against Lony Cadayday, that was his second match against a Filipino boxer. Cataraja won via a Round 1 knockout (KO).

On 16 September 2017, Cataraja extended his winning streak by defeating Wiljan Ugbaniel via a Round 2 knockout (KO). Ugbaniel was Cataraja's third Filipino opponent. 9 months later, Cataraja registered another victory by defeating Indonesian boxer Frengky Rohi via a Round 3 technical knockout (TKO).

On 24 November 2018, Cataraja defeated Mexican boxer Victor Hugo Reyes winning a unanimous decision (UD) through ten rounds. Cataraja won the vacant WBO Youth Super Flyweight Title. Cataraja's next bout was against Delfin de Asis, that was his fourth match against a Filipino boxer. Cataraja won via a Round 3 technical knockout (TKO).

In September 2019, Cataraja registered his 11th-straight win against fellow Filipino boxer, Crison Omayao, winning the match via a third-round TKO.

In December 2020, more than one year from his previous fight, Cataraja returned to the ring and defeated fellow Filipino boxer John Mark Apolinario via a Round 1 knockout (KO).

It was reported that Cataraja was scheduled to face fellow Filipino boxer, Cris Alfante ion 16 July 2021. Cataraja defeated Alfante via a Round 7 (TKO).

Cataraja was scheduled to face Romshane Sarguilla on 26 February 2022. He defeated Sarguilla via a Round 3 (TKO).

On 11 February 2023, Cataraja won the OPBF Super Flyweight title by defeating fellow Filipino boxer Edward Heno via a unanimous decision (UD).

Professional boxing record

Titles in boxing

Minor titles
WBO Youth Super Flyweight title (115 lbs)
OPBF Super Flyweight title (115 lbs)

References

External links

1995 births
Living people
Flyweight boxers
Super-flyweight boxers
Filipino male boxers
Boxers from Cebu
Cebuano people
Visayan people
Sportspeople from Cebu
People from Cebu City